The Râușor is a right tributary of the river Breazova in Romania. It flows into the Breazova in Sarmizegetusa.

References

Rivers of Romania
Rivers of Hunedoara County